The ALICO Building is a 22-story office building in downtown Waco, Texas, United States, located at the intersection of Austin and 5th Street. The building is currently owned and operated by the American-Amicable Life Insurance Company of Texas (a subsidiary of Industrial Alliance).

History

It is the second oldest skyscraper built in Texas as well as the oldest skyscraper in Texas still standing, after the Praetorian Building in Dallas, built in the year prior to ALICO, was demolished in 2013.

The ALICO Building was not heavily damaged by the 1953 Waco tornado outbreak, unlike many buildings in downtown Waco. It swayed several feet when directly hit by the tornado, although the building escaped severe damage or collapse.

In 1965, Amicable Life Insurance Company and American Life Insurance Company merged to become the American-Amicable Life Insurance Company, the current tenant of the building. In 1966, the building underwent renovations, including the addition of the large neon sign at the top of the building displaying the acronym "ALICO".

In 1982, the ALICO building was designated a historical landmark by the Texas Historical Commission. In 2012, it was added to the National Register of Historic Places as part of the Waco Downtown Historic District.

References

Further reading
 
 
 

Buildings and structures in Waco, Texas
Historic district contributing properties in Texas
Office buildings completed in 1910
Sanguinet & Staats buildings
Skyscraper office buildings in Texas